Betsy McKinney (born March 24, 1939) is an American politician in the state of New Hampshire. She is a member of the New Hampshire House of Representatives, sitting as a Republican from the Rockingham 5 district, having been first elected in 1984.

References

1939 births
Living people
Republican Party members of the New Hampshire House of Representatives
Women state legislators in New Hampshire
21st-century American women politicians